= Koullouh illa kidah =

Kulluh illa keda (Everything Except That)
- Directed by: Edmon Tuéma
- Written by: Mohamed Younis Al Qadi
- Starring: Baba Azzeddine, Mohamed Kamal El Masry, Abdel Hamid Zaki, Sirena Ibrahim
- Edited by: Anis Abid
- Music by: Ezzat El Gahli
- Release date: 1936
- Running time: 110 minutes
- Country: Egypt
- Language: Egyptian Arabic

Kulluh illa keda (Arabic: كله إلا كده, Everything Except That) is a 1936 Egyptian drama film directed by Edmon Tuéma, with story, screenplay, and dialogue by Mohamed Younis Al Qadi. The film stars Baba Azzeddine, Mohamed Kamal El Masry, Abdel Hamid Zaki, and Sirena Ibrahim. It tells the story of Shahin, a fruit merchant who aspires to a life of debauchery and becomes acquainted with the dancer Fakiha who steals his heart and cons him out of his money. Eventually, Fakiha uses her cunning to establish a nightclub using Shahin's stolen fortune, forcing him to work in the establishment he unwittingly funded.

The film was released in Egyptian theaters on December 7, 1936.

The film received a rating of 5.7/10 on the Arabic film database "elcinema.com".

== Plot ==
Shahin, a fruit merchant, aspires to a life of debauchery and becomes acquainted with Fakiha, a dancer who steals his heart. As Fakiha cons him out of his money, Shahin's financial situation worsens. Eventually, Fakiha uses her cunning and Shahin's stolen fortune to establish a nightclub, forcing Shahin to work in the very establishment he unwittingly funded.

== Cast ==
- Baba Azzeddine as Fakiha
- Mohamed Kamal El Masry as Sharafantah (Sharafantah)
- Abdel Hamid Zaki as Shahin
- Sirena Ibrahim as Umm Mufida (أم مفيدة)
- Fathia Fouad
- Saleh Al-Jahly
- Ibrahim Al-Jazar
- Amin Allaf
- Sayed Mustafa as Ali

== Reception ==
Kulluh illa keda received a rating of 5.7/10 on the Arabic film database "elcinema.com". The film is considered a classic Egyptian drama from the 1930s.
